The 1986 Eisenhower Trophy took place 22 to 25 October at the Lagunita Country Club in Caracas, Venezuela. It was the 15th World Amateur Team Championship for the Eisenhower Trophy. The tournament was a 72-hole stroke play team event with 39 four-man teams. The best three scores for each round counted towards the team total.

Canada won the Eisenhower Trophy for the first time, finishing three strokes ahead of the silver medalists, United States. Chinese Taipei took the bronze medal, a further eight strokes behind with Sweden finishing fourth. Eduardo Herrera, representing Colombia, had the lowest individual score, 5-under-par 275.

Teams
39 four-man teams contested the event.

The following table lists the players on the leading teams.

Scores

Source:

Individual leaders
There was no official recognition for the lowest individual scores.

Source:

References

External links
Record Book on International Golf Federation website 

Eisenhower Trophy
Golf tournaments in Venezuela
Eisenhower Trophy
Eisenhower Trophy
Eisenhower Trophy